A thought disorder (TD) is any disturbance in cognition that adversely affects language and thought content, and thereby communication. A variety of thought disorders were said to be characteristic of people with schizophrenia. A content-thought disorder is typically characterized by the experience of multiple delusional fragments. The term thought disorder is often used to refer to a formal thought disorder.

A formal thought disorder (FTD) is a disruption of the form or structure of thought. Formal thought disorder, also known as disorganized thinking, results in disorganized speech and is recognized as a major feature of schizophrenia and other psychoses. FTD is also associated with conditions including mood disorders, dementia, mania, and neurological diseases. Disorganized speech leads to an inference of disorganized thoughts.

Types of thought disorders include derailment, pressured speech, poverty of speech, tangentiality, verbigeration, and thought blocking.

Formal thought disorder is a disorder of the form of thought rather than of content of thought that covers hallucinations and delusions. FTD, unlike hallucinations and delusions, is an observable, objective sign of psychosis. FTD is a common and core symptom of a psychotic disorder and may be seen as a marker of its severity, and also as a predictor of prognosis. It reflects a cluster of cognitive, linguistic, and affective disturbances that have generated research interest in the fields of cognitive neuroscience, neurolinguistics, and psychiatry.

Eugen Bleuler, who named schizophrenia, held that thought disorder was its defining characteristic. However, disturbances of thinking and speech such as clanging or echolalia may be present in Tourette syndrome, or other symptoms as found in delirium. A clinical difference exists between these two groups. Those with psychoses are less likely to show an awareness or concern about the disordered thinking, while those with other disorders do show awareness and concerns about not being able to think clearly.

Content-thought disorder 
Content-thought disorder is a thought disturbance in which a person experiences multiple, fragmented delusions, typically a feature of schizophrenia and some other mental disorders including obsessive–compulsive disorder and mania. At the core of thought-content disturbance are abnormal beliefs and convictions, after accounting for the person's culture and backgrounds; these range from overvalued ideas to fixed delusions. Typically, abnormal beliefs and delusions are non-specific diagnostically, even if some delusions are more prevalent in one disorder than another.

Neurotypical thoughtconsisting of awareness, concerns, beliefs, preoccupations, wishes, fantasies, imagination, and conceptscan be illogical, and can contain beliefs and prejudices/biases that are obviously contradictory. Individuals also have considerable variations, and the same person's thinking also may shift considerably from time to time.

Content-thought disorder is not limited to delusions. Other possible abnormalities include suicidal ideas, violent ideas, and homicidal ideas as well as the following:
 Preoccupation: centering thought to a particular idea in association with strong affection 
 Obsession: a persistent thought, idea, or image that is intrusive or inappropriate, and is distressing or upsetting 
 Compulsive behavior: the need to perform an act persistently and repetitivelywithout it necessarily leading to an actual reward or pleasureto reduce distress 
 Magical thinking: belief that one's thoughts by themselves can bring about effects in the world, or that thinking something corresponds with doing the same thing 
 Overvalued ideas: false or exaggerated belief that is held with conviction but not with delusional intensity 
 Phobias: irrational fears of objects or circumstances

In psychosis, delusions are the most common thought-content abnormalities. A delusion is a firm and fixed belief based on inadequate grounds not amenable to rational argument or evidence to the contrary, and not in sync with regional, cultural, or educational background. Delusions are common in people with mania, depression, schizoaffective disorder, delirium, dementia, substance use disorders, schizophrenia, and delusional disorders. Common examples in mental status examination include the following:
 Erotomania: belief that someone is in love with oneself
 Grandiose delusions: belief that one is the greatest, strongest, fastest, richest, and/or most intelligent person ever
 Persecutory delusion: belief that the person, or someone to whom the person is close, is being malevolently treated in some way
 Ideas of reference and delusions of reference: belief that insignificant remarks, coincidental events, or innocuous objects in one's environment have personal meaning or significance
 Thought broadcasting: belief that others can hear or are aware of one's thoughts
 Thought insertion: belief that one's thoughts are not one's own but rather belong to someone else and have been inserted into one's mind
 Thought withdrawal: belief that thoughts have been "taken out" of one's mind, and that one has no power over this
 Influence: belief that other people or external agents are covertly exerting power over oneself
 Outside control: belief that outside forces are controlling one's thoughts, feelings, and actions
 Infidelity: belief that a partner is cheating on oneself
 Somatic: belief that one has a disease or medical condition
 Nihilistic: belief that the mind, the body, the world at large, or parts thereof no longer exist

Formal thought disorder

Overview 
Formal thought disorder (FTD), or simply thought disorder, is also known as disorganized speech. It is evident from disorganized thinking, and is one of the hallmark features of schizophrenia. Formal thought disorder is a disorder of the form of thought rather than of the content of thought that covers hallucinations and delusions. FTD, unlike hallucinations and delusions, is an observable sign of psychosis. FTD is a common and core symptom of a psychotic disorder and may be seen as a marker of its severity and also as a predictor of prognosis. It reflects a cluster of cognitive, linguistic, and affective disturbances, that has generated research interest from the fields of cognitive neuroscience, neurolinguistics, and psychiatry.

FTD is a complex, multidimensional syndrome characterized by deficiencies in the logical organizing of thought needed to achieve goals. FTD can be subdivided into clusters of positive and negative symptoms, as well as objective versus subjective symptoms. Within the scale of positive and negative symptoms they have been grouped into positive formal thought disorder (posFTD) and negative formal thought disorder (negFTD). Positive subtypes were those of pressure of speech, tangentiality, derailment, incoherence, and illogicality. Negative subtypes were those of poverty of speech and poverty of content. The two groups were posited to be at either end of a spectrum of normal speech. However, later studies showed these to be poorly correlated. A comprehensive measure of formal thought disorder is the Thought and Language Disorder (TALD) Scale.

Nancy Andreasen preferred to call the thought disorders collectively as thought-language-communication disorders (TLC disorders).
Within the Thought, Language, Communication (TLC) Scale up to seven domains of FTD have been described with most of the variance accounted for by just two or three domains. Some TLC disorders are more suggestive of a severe disorder and given priority by listing them in the first 11 items.

Diagnoses 
The DSM V categorizes FTD as "a psychotic symptom, manifested as bizarre speech and communication." FTD may include incoherence, peculiar words, disconnected ideas, or a lack of the unprompted content we would expect from normal speech. Clinical psychologists typically assess FTD by initiating an exploratory conversation with patients and observing the patient's verbal responses.

FTD is often used to establish a diagnosis of schizophrenia, and as such, in cross-sectional studies 27–80% of patients with schizophrenia present with FTD. FTD, although a hallmark feature of schizophrenia, is also widespread amongst those with other psychiatric disorders; up to 60% of those with schizoaffective disorder, and 53% of those with clinical depression show FTD, suggesting FTD is not pathognomonic of schizophrenia. Around 6% of healthy probands show a mild form of FTD.

The characteristics of FTD vary amongst disorders. Multiple studies show that FTD in mania is marked by irrelevant intrusions and pronounced combinatory thinking, usually with a playfulness and flippancy lacking in patients with schizophrenia. The FTD present in patients with schizophrenia, however, was characterized by disorganization, neologism, and fluid thinking; as well as confusion with word-finding difficulty.

There is limited data on the longitudinal course of FTD. The most comprehensive longitudinal study of FTD done to date found a distinction in the longitudinal course of thought disorder symptoms between schizophrenia and other psychotic disorders. The study also found an association between pre-index assessments of social, work and educational functioning and the longitudinal course of FTD.

Speculative causes 

Several theories have been developed to explain the causes of formal thought disorder. 
It has been proposed that formal thought disorder relates to neurocognition via semantic memory. Semantic network impairment in people with schizophreniameasured by the difference between fluency (e.g. number of animals' names produced in 60 seconds) and phonological fluency (e.g. number of words beginning with "F" produced in 60 seconds)predicts the severity of formal thought disorder, suggesting that verbal information (through semantic priming) is unavailable.  Other hypotheses include working memory deficit (being confused about what has already been said in a conversation) and attentional focus.

FTD in schizophrenia has been found to be associated with structural and functional abnormalities in the language network. Structural studies have found bilateral grey matter deficits in the language network. In particular, the bilateral inferior frontal gyrus, bilateral inferior parietal lobule and bilateral superior temporal gyrus to be FTD correlates. However, there are studies that did not find an association between FTD and structural aberrations of the language network and regions not included in the language network have been associated with FTD. Thus, future research is needed to clarify whether there is an association with FTD in schizophrenia and neural abnormalities in the language network.

There has also been investigation into the transmitter systems that might cause FTD. Studies have found that glutamate dysfunction, due to a rarefication of glutamatergic synapses in the superior temporal gyrus in patients' schizophrenia, is a major cause for positive FTD.

The heritability of FTD has been demonstrated in myriad family and twin studies. Imaging genetics studies, using a semantic verbal fluency task performed by the participants during functional MRI scanning, revealed that alleles linked to glutamatergic transmission contribute to functional aberrations in typical language-related brain areas. However, FTD is not solely genetically determined: environmental influences, such as allusive thinking in parents during childhood, and general environmental risk factors for schizophrenia (childhood abuse, migration, social isolation, cannabis, etc.) also contribute to the pathophysiology of FTD.

The origins of FTD have also been conceptualized from a social-learning perspective. Singer and Wynne contended that familial communication patterns play a key role in shaping the development of FTD—believing that dysfunctional social interactions undermine a child's development of cohesive, stable mental representations of the world, therefore increasing their risk of developing FTD.

Treatments 
Antipsychotic medication is often utilised to treat FTD. The vast majority of studies examining the efficacy of antipsychotic treatment do not report the effects on syndromes or symptoms. Nevertheless, there are six older studies reporting on the effects of antipsychotic treatment on FTD. From these studies and from clinical experience, we know that antipsychotics are often an effective treatment for patients with positive or negative FTD. There is, however, a subgroup of patients with treatment refractory FTD.

Cognitive behavioural therapy (CBT) is another example of a treatment for FTD. There is currently very little research exploring the effectiveness of CBT for individuals with FTD. Large randomised controlled trials evaluating the effectiveness of CBT for treating psychosis often exclude individuals with high levels of FTD due to FTD reducing therapeutic alliance which is associated with key outcomes in therapy. However, there is some provisional evidence suggesting that FTD may not preclude the effectiveness of CBT.
Kircher and colleagues have suggested that the following methods should be used in CBT for treating patients with FTD:

Practise structuring, summarising, and feedback methods
Repeat and clarify the core issues and main emotions that the patient is trying to communicate
Gently encourage patients to clarify what they are trying to communicate
Ask patients to clearly state their communication goal
Ask patients to slow down and explain how one point leads to another
Help patients identify the links between ideas
Identify the main affect linked to the thought disorder
Normalise problems with thinking

Signs and symptoms 
In the general population, there will always be abnormalities in language and their presence is therefore not always diagnostic of any condition. Language abnormalities can occur in schizophrenia and other disorders such as mania or depression, and can also occur in anybody who may simply be tired or stressed. To distinguish thought disorder, patterns of speech, severity of symptoms, their frequency, and resulting functional impairment can be considered.

Symptoms of thought disorder include derailment, pressured speech, poverty of speech, tangentiality, and thought blocking. FTD is a hallmark feature of schizophrenia, but is also associated with other conditions including mood disorders, dementia, mania, and neurological diseases. Impaired attention, poor memory, and difficulty formulating abstract concepts may also reflect thought disorder, and can be observed or assessed with mental status tests such as serial sevens or memory tests.

Types 
There are many features of thought disorders. They are also referred to as symptoms of formal thought disorder of which 30 are described including:

Alogia (also poverty of speech) 
A poverty of speech, either in amount or content. Under negative/positive symptom classification of schizophrenia, it is classified as a negative symptom. When classifying symptoms into more dimensions, poverty of speech content—paucity of meaningful content with normal amount of speech—is a disorganization symptom, whereas poverty of speech—loss of speech production—is a negative symptom. Under SANS, thought blocking is considered a part of alogia, and so is increased latency in response.

Blocking or thought blocking (also deprivation of thought and obstructive thought).
 An abrupt stop in the middle of a train of thought which may or not be able to be continued.

Circumstantial speech (also circumstantial thinking)
 An inability to answer a question without giving excessive, unnecessary detail. This differs from tangential thinking, in that the person does eventually return to the original point. For example, the patient answers the question "how have you been sleeping lately?" with "Oh, I go to bed early, so I can get plenty of rest. I like to listen to music or read before bed. Right now I'm reading a good mystery. Maybe I'll write a mystery someday. But it isn't helping, reading I mean. I have been getting only 2 or 3 hours of sleep at night."

Clanging
 An instance where ideas are related only by similar or rhyming sounds rather than actual meaning. This may be heard as excessive rhyming and/or alliteration. e.g. "Many moldy mushrooms merge out of the mildewy mud on Mondays." "I heard the bell. Well, hell, then I fell." It is most commonly seen in bipolar disorder (manic phase), although it is often observed in patients with primary psychoses, namely schizophrenia and schizoaffective disorder.

Derailment (also called loose association and knight's move thinking)
 Thought frequently moves from one idea to another which is obliquely related or unrelated, often appearing in speech but also in writing, e.g. "The next day when I'd be going out you know, I took control, like uh, I put bleach on my hair in California."

Distractible speech
 During mid speech, the subject is changed in response to a nearby stimulus. e.g. "Then I left San Francisco and moved to... Where did you get that tie?"

Echolalia
 Echoing of another's speech that may only occur once, or may be continuous in repetition. This may involve repeating only the last few words or last word of the examiner's sentences. This can happen immediately after a stimuli, or months to years later. Echolalia is commonly seen with Autism and Tourette's Syndrome, although there are plenty of disorders that it can be attributed to. e.g. "What would you like for dinner?", "What would you like for dinner?" "That's a good question." "That's a good question."

Evasion
 The next logical idea in a sequence is replaced with another idea closely but not accurately or appropriately related to it. Also called paralogia and perverted logic. Example: "I... er ah... you are uh... I think you have... uh-- acceptable erm... uh... hair."

Flight of ideas
 A form of formal thought disorder marked by abrupt leaps from one topic to another, possibly with discernable links between successive ideas, perhaps governed by similarities between subjects or, in somewhat higher grades, by rhyming, puns, and word plays, or by innocuous environmental stimuli – e.g., the sound of birds chirping. It is most characteristic of the manic phase of bipolar illness.

Illogicality
 Conclusions are reached that do not follow logically (non-sequiturs or faulty inferences). e.g. "Do you think this will fit in the box?" draws a reply like "Well of course; it's brown, isn't it?"

Incoherence or word salad
 Speech that is unintelligible because, though the individual words are real words, the manner in which they are strung together results in incoherent gibberish, e.g. the question "Why do people comb their hair?" elicits a response like "Because it makes a twirl in life, my box is broken help me blue elephant. Isn't lettuce brave? I like electrons, hello please!"

Neologisms
 Forms completely new words or phrases whose origins and meanings are usually unrecognizable.  Example is "I got so angry I picked up a dish and threw it at the geshinker." These may also involve elisions of two words that are similar in meaning or in sound. Although neologisms may sometimes refer to words that are formed incorrectly but whose origins are understandable (e.g. "headshoe" for hat), these can be more clearly referred to as word approximations.

Overinclusion
 The failure to eliminate ineffective, inappropriate, irrelevant, extraneous details associated with a particular stimulus.

Perseveration
 Persistent repetition of words or ideas even when another person attempts to change the topic. e.g. "It's great to be here in Nevada, Nevada, Nevada, Nevada, Nevada." This may also involve repeatedly giving the same answer to different questions. e.g. "Is your name Mary?"  "Yes."  "Are you in the hospital?"  "Yes."  "Are you a table?"  "Yes." Perseveration can include palilalia and logoclonia, and can be an indication of organic brain disease such as Parkinson's.

Phonemic paraphasia
 Mispronunciation; syllables out of sequence. e.g. "I slipped on the lice and broke my arm."

Pressured speech
 Rapid speech without pauses which is difficult to interrupt.

Referential thinking
 "Patients tendency to view innocuous stimuli as having a specific meaning for the self." This could be seen as them repeatedly and inappropriately referring back to self. e.g. "What's the time?", "It's 7 o'clock. That's my problem."

Semantic paraphasia
 Substitution of inappropriate word. e.g. "I slipped on the coat, on the ice I mean, and broke my book."

Stilted speech
 Speech characterized by the use of words or phrases that are flowery, excessive, and pompous, e.g. "The attorney comported himself indecorously."

Tangential speech
 Wandering from the topic and never returning to it or providing the information requested. For example, in answer to the question "Where are you from?", the person answers "My dog is from England. They have good fish and chips there. Fish breathe through gills."

Verbigeration
 Meaningless and stereotyped repetition of words or phrases replacing understandable speech, as seen in schizophrenia.

Use of term

Some recent (2015, 2017) psychiatric/psychological glossaries defined thought disorder as disturbed thinking or cognition that affects communication, language, or thought content including poverty of ideas, neologisms, paralogia, word salad, and delusionswhich are disturbance of both thought content and thought formand suggested the more specific terms of content thought disorder and formal thought disorder,
with content thought disorder defined as a thought disturbance characterized by multiple fragmented delusions, and formal thought disorder defined as disturbance in the form or structure of thinking.
For example, DSM-5 (2013) only used the word formal thought disorder, mostly as a synonym of disorganized thinking and disorganized speech.
This is in contrast with ICD-10 (1992) which only used the word "thought disorder", always accompanied with "delusion" and "hallucination" separately, and a general medical dictionary (2002) that although generally defined thought disorders similarly to the psychiatric glossaries, but also used the word in other entries as ICD-10 did.

The recent psychiatric text (2017) also mentioned when describing thought disorder as a "disorganization syndrome" within the context of schizophrenia:

The same text also mentioned that some clinicians use the term "formal thought disorder" broadly referring to abnormalities in thought form plus any psychotic cognitive sign or symptom, and that various studies examining cognition and subsymdromes in schizophrenia may refer to formal thought disorder as "conceptual disorganization" or "disorganization factor."

Still, there may be other dissenting opinions, including:

Course, diagnosis, and prognosis
It was believed that thought disorder occurred only in schizophrenia, but later findings indicate it may occur in other psychiatric conditions including mania, and occurs even in people without mental illness.  Also, people with schizophrenia do not all exhibit thought disorder, so not having any thought disorder does not mean the person does not have schizophrenia, i.e. the condition is not very specific to the disease.

When adopting specific definitions of thought disorder subtypes and classifying them as positive and negative symptoms, Nancy Andreasen found 
that different subtypes of thought disorder occur at different frequencies among those with manic, depression, and schizophrenia. People with mania have pressured speech as the most prominent symptom, but also have relatively high rates of derailment, tangentiality, and incoherence which are as prominent as in those with schizophrenia. They are likelier to have pressured speech, distractibility, and circumstantiality.

People with schizophrenia have more negative thought disorder including poverty of speech and poverty of content of speech, but also have relatively high rates of certain positive thought disorders.
Derailment, loss of goal, poverty of content of speech, tangentiality and illogicality are particularly characteristic of schizophrenia.
People with depression have relatively less thought disorders; the most prominent are poverty of speech, poverty of content of speech, and circumstantiality. She found the diagnostic usefulness of dividing the symptoms into subtypes, such as having negative thought disorders without the full affective symptoms highly suggest schizophrenia.

She also found prognostic values of negative/positive symptom divisions.  In manic patients, most thought disorders return to normal levels 6 months after evaluation which suggests that thought disorders in this condition, although as severe as in schizophrenia, tend to be recoverable.  In people with schizophrenia, however, negative thought disorders remain after six months, and sometimes worsen.  Positive thought disorders get better somewhat.  Also, negative thought disorder is a good predictor of some outcomes, e.g. patients with prominent negative thought disorders do worse on social functioning six months later.
So, in general, having more prominent negative symptoms suggest a worse outcome.  Nevertheless, some people may do well, respond to medication, and have normal brain function. The positive symptoms are similar vice versa.

At illness onset, prominent thought disorder also predicts worse prognosis, including: 
 illness begins earlier
 increased risk of hospitalization
 decreased functional outcomes
 increased disability rates 
 increased inappropriate social behaviors
Thought disorder unresponsive to treatment also predicts worse illness course.
In schizophrenia, thought disorders' severity tend to be more stable than hallucinations and delusions.  Prominent thought disorders are more unlikely to diminish in middle age compared to positive symptoms.
Less severe thought disorder may occur during the prodromal and residual periods of schizophrenia. Treatment for thought disorder may include psychotherapy such as cognitive behavior therapy (CBT) and/or psychotropic medications.

DSM-5 include delusions, hallucinations, disorganized thought process (formal thought disorder), and disorganized or abnormal motor behavior (including catatonia) as key symptoms in "psychosis".  Although not specific to different diagnoses, certain aspects of psychosis are characteristic of some diagnoses.
Schizophrenia spectrum disorders (e.g., schizoaffective disorder, schizophreniform disorder) typically consist of prominent hallucinations and/or delusions as well as formal thought disorderdisplayed as severe behavioral abnormalities including disorganized, bizarre, and catatonic behavior.
Psychotic disorders due to general medical conditions and substance-induced psychotic disorders typically consist of delusions and/or hallucinations.
Delusional disorder and shared psychotic disorder, which are more rare, typically consist of persistent delusions.
Research found that most formal thought disorders are commonly found in schizophrenia and mood disorders, but poverty of speech content is more common in schizophrenia.

Experienced clinicians may distinguish true psychosis, such as in schizophrenia, and bipolar mania, from malingering, when an individual fakes illness for other gains, by clinical presentations.  For example, malingerers feign thought contents with no irregularities in form such as derailment or looseness of associations.  Negative symptoms including alogia may not be present.  In addition, chronic thought disorder is typically distressing.

Typically, autism spectrum disorders (ASD), whose diagnosis requires onset of symptoms prior to 3 years of age, can be distinguished from early-onset schizophrenia by disease onset occurrence (schizophrenia manifestation under age 10 is extremely rare) and the fact that ASD patients do not display formal thought disorders.
However, it has been suggested that individuals with autism spectrum disorders (ASD) display language disturbances like those found in schizophrenia; a 2008 study found that children and adolescents with ASD showed significantly more illogical thinking and loose associations than control subjects. The illogical thinking was related to cognitive functioning and executive control; the loose associations were related to communication symptoms and to parent reports of stress and anxiety.

Rorschach inkblots have shown to be a very useful tool in assessing thought disorder in disturbed patients. A series of inkblots are shown and the responses to them by the patients are recorded and further analyzed to determine disturbances of thought. The nature of the assessment itself offers insight to the cognitive processes of another and how they respond to equivocal stimuli. Hermann Rorschach first developed this test as a measure for diagnosing schizophrenia after realizing that people with schizophrenia gave drastically different interpretations of Klecksographie inkblots as compared to others who's thought process was considered normal. It has since been one of the most widely used assessment tools in diagnosing thought disorders.

The Thought Disorder Index (TDI), also called the Delta Index, was developed to help further determine the severity of thought disorder in verbal responses. TDI scores are mainly derived from verbally expressed interpretations of the Rorschach Inkblot Test, but TDI can also be used with other verbal samples including the Wechsler Adult Intelligence Scale. TDI includes a twenty-three-category scoring index. Each category scores the level of severity on a scale from 0–1, with .25 being mild and 1.00 being most severe (.25, .50, .75, 1.00).

Criticisms
The concept of thought disorder has been criticized as being based on circular or incoherent definitions. For example, symptoms of thought disorder are inferred from disordered speech, based on the assumption that disordered speech arises because of disordered thought. Incoherence, or word salad, refers to speech that is semantically unconnected and conveys no meaning to the listener.

Furthermore, although thought disorder is typically associated with psychosis, similar phenomena can appear in different disorders, potentially leading to misdiagnosis—for example, in the case of incomplete yet potentially fruitful thought processes.

Another criticism related to the separation of symptoms of schizophrenia into negative/positive symptoms, including thought disorder, is that it oversimplifies the complexity of thought disorder and its relationship with other positive symptoms.  Later factor analysis studies found that negative symptoms tend to correlate with one another, while positive symptoms tend to separate into two groups.
The three clusters became roughly known as negative symptoms, psychotic symptoms, and disorganization symptoms.
Alogia, a thought disorder traditionally classified as a negative symptom, can be separated into two separate groups: poverty of speech content as a disorganization symptom, and poverty of speech, response latency, and thought blocking as negative symptoms.
Nevertheless, the efforts that led to the positive/negative symptom diametrics may allow the more accurate characterization of schizophrenia in the later works.

See also 
 Aphasia
 Auditory processing disorder
 Emil Kraepelin's dream speech
 Speech and language pathology

References

Further reading 

 
 
 
 
 

Psychosis